The Bureau of Near Eastern Affairs (NEA), also known as the Bureau of Near East Asian Affairs, is an agency of the Department of State within the United States government that deals with U.S. foreign policy and diplomatic relations with the nations of the Near East. It is headed by the Assistant Secretary of State for Near Eastern Affairs, who reports to the Under Secretary of State for Political Affairs.

Organization
The offices of the Bureau of Near Eastern Affairs direct, coordinate, and supervise U.S. government activities within the region, including political, economic, consular, public diplomacy, and administrative management issues.

Office of Levant Affairs – Responsible for U.S. relations with Jordan, Lebanon, and Syria
Office of Maghreb Affairs – Responsible for U.S. relations with Algeria, Libya, Morocco, and Tunisia
Office of Arabian Peninsula Affairs – Responsible for shaping, coordinating and implementing foreign policy in Bahrain, Kuwait, Oman, Qatar, Saudi Arabia, the United Arab Emirates, and Yemen
Office of Israel and Palestinian Affairs – Responsible for diplomatic issues associated with the Israeli–Palestinian conflict
Office of Iraqi Affairs – Oversees Iraq–United States relations
Office of Iranian Affairs – Develops, coordinates, recommends, and executes U.S. policy on Iran
Office of Regional and Multilateral Affairs – Responsible for regional political and economic issues, including political-military affairs, multilateral organizations, labor and social affairs, counternarcotics, environment, refugees, counterterrorism, and human rights
Office of Egyptian Affairs – Responsible for U.S. relations with Egypt
Office of Press and Public Diplomacy – Responsible for the coordination of public diplomacy activities in the NEA region, and preparing press guidance for the Department Spokesperson in the Bureau of Public Affairs
Office of Middle East Partnership Initiative – Responsible for programming in support of reform throughout the region, with special emphasis on empowering women and youth, education, strengthening economies, and broadening political participation

Organization
The bureau is currently led by Joey Hood, a career diplomat serving as the Acting Assistant Secretary. From June 5, 2019, to January 20, 2021, the bureau was led by Assistant Secretary David Schenker. He was preceded by David Satterfield (acting). See Assistant Secretary of State for Near Eastern Affairs for the list of all incumbents.

References

NEA
United States diplomacy
Government agencies established in 1992
1992 establishments in Washington, D.C.
United States–Middle Eastern relations
Arab–American relations
Algeria–United States relations
Bahrain–United States relations
Egypt–United States relations
Iran–United States relations
Iraq–United States relations
Israel–United States relations
Jordan–United States relations
Kuwait–United States relations
Lebanon–United States relations
Libya–United States relations
Morocco–United States relations
Oman–United States relations
Qatar–United States relations
Saudi Arabia–United States relations
State of Palestine–United States relations
Syria–United States relations
Tunisia–United States relations
United Arab Emirates–United States relations
United States–Yemen relations